Charles Lachman is an Executive Producer of the news magazine program Inside Edition, based in New York City. The show has been on the air for more than two decades and is consistently in the top ten-rated programs in first-run national syndication.

Prior to joining Inside Edition, Lachman served as co-Executive Producer of American Journal and Managing Editor of the nightly news broadcasts at WNYW-TV in New York City. He was also a reporter for the New York Post.

He is the author of the novel In the Name of the Law (1988), the historical saga The Last Lincolns: The Rise & Fall of a Great American Family (2008), and A Secret Life (2011), an investigative history of President Grover Cleveland. His newest book is Footsteps in the Snow (2014), a true crime saga about the coldest case in U.S. history.

Lachman is married to Nancy Glass, the television host, producer and owner of Glass Entertainment Group. He lives in New York City.

Bibliography

Notes

Year of birth missing (living people)
Living people
20th-century American novelists
American male novelists
Television producers from New York City
20th-century American male writers
Novelists from New York (state)